Danila Kuznetsov (born 10 December 1976) is a Russian slalom canoeist who competed in the mid- to late-1990s. He finished 27th in the C-1 event at the 1996 Summer Olympics in Atlanta.

References
Sports-Reference.com profile

1976 births
Canoeists at the 1996 Summer Olympics
Living people
Olympic canoeists of Russia
Russian male canoeists
Place of birth missing (living people)